The following is a list of notable restaurant chains in the United States.

Asian/Pacific

Baked goods

Beef

Beverages

Chicken

Frozen desserts

Hamburgers

Hot dogs

Mexican/Tex-Mex

Pizza/Italian

Salad/vegetarian/vegan

Sandwiches

Seafood

Casual dining 
Casual dining restaurants below are split by the type of cuisine they serve.

American

Asian/Asian fusion

Bar/brewpub

Breakfast

Caribbean

Chicken

European

Hamburgers

Mexican/Tex-Mex

Italian

Pizza

Salad/vegan

Seafood

Southern/barbecue

Steakhouse

Arcade and game centers

Defunct
 Beefsteak Charlie's
 Bikinis Sports Bar & Grill
 Bill Knapp's
 Bugaboo Creek Steakhouse
 Chi Chi's
 Chicken in the Rough
 ESPN Zone
 Fresh Choice
 Furr's
 Good Earth
 Horne's
 Lone Star Steakhouse & Saloon
 Lyon's
 Red Barn
 ShowBiz Pizza Place
 York Steak House

See also
 List of coffeehouse chains
 List of ice cream parlor chains
 List of pizza chains
 List of restaurant chains
 List of revolving restaurants
 Lists of restaurants
 Lists of foodchains in USA

References

Restaurant chains, United States
United States

Restaurant chains